This is a list of the members of the 14th Seanad Éireann, the upper house of the Oireachtas (legislature) of Ireland.  These Senators were elected or appointed in 1977, after the 1977 general election and served until the close of poll for the 15th Seanad in 1981.

Composition of the 14th Seanad
There are a total of 60 seats in the Seanad. 43 Senators are elected by the Vocational panels, 6 elected by the Universities and 11 are nominated by the Taoiseach.

The following table shows the composition by party when the 14th Seanad first met on 27 October 1977.

List of senators

Changes

See also
Members of the 21st Dáil
Government of the 21st Dáil

Sources

Notes and references

 
14